René Taton (4 April 1915 – 9 August 2004) was a French author, historian of science, and long co-editor (along with Suzanne Delorme) of the Revue d'histoire des sciences.

Life 

He was born on 4 April 1915 in L'Échelle.

He died on 9 August 2004 in Ajaccio.

Career 

In 1935, he became a student of École normale supérieure de Saint-Cloud.

He was the co-editor of Journal of history of science.

His General History of Science (last edition in 1996, PUF, Quadriga) is a major reference in the field of history of science

Works 

 To continue the calculus (collection of Abbot Moreux), 1945?
 History of computing, coll. "What do I know? "1946
 Mental arithmetic , Presses Universitaires de France , coll. "What do I know? " n o 605, Paris. First edition: 1953, 128 p., (notice BnF n o  FRBNF326561651 ) . Last Edit: 1979, 126 p.,, (notice BnF n o  FRBNF34655169f ) .
 Casualties and accidents of scientific discovery: illustration of some characteristic stages of the evolution of science, published by Masson et al. "Evolution Science" n o 6, Paris, 1955, 172 p., (notice BnF n o  FRBNF32656167q ) .
 General History of Science (1957 to 1964), reissue (1966-1983).
 Historical Studies of Science (collected his 85 th birthday by Danielle Fauque Myriana Ilic and Robert Halleux), Brepols Publishing, coll. "From diversis artibus" n o 47, Turnhout, 2000, 544 p.,, (notice BnF n o  FRBNF37734558t ) .
 Later writings, 2000, compiled by R. Halleux

External links
CAPH - Archive Centre of Philosophy, History and Science Edition (USR 3308 CIRPHLES, CNRS / ENS) Archival work of René Taton.

1915 births
2004 deaths
French historians of mathematics
French male non-fiction writers
20th-century French male writers